John Guerrant Miller (1795–1871) was the 13th mayor of Columbus, Ohio.  He was also the 12th person to serve in that office.   He resigned his office as mayor on May 4, 1841 to become postmaster in Columbus.  He served Columbus as mayor for 13 months.  His successor after 1841 was Thomas Wood.

References

Bibliography

External links
John Guerrant Miller at Political Graveyard

Mayors of Columbus, Ohio
1795 births
1871 deaths
People from Goochland County, Virginia
19th-century American politicians